Agnews Developmental Center was a psychiatric and medical care facility, located in Santa Clara, California.

In 1885, the center, originally known as "The Great Asylum for the Insane", was established as a facility for the care of the mentally ill. The main structure, a red brick edifice, was located on land near Agnew's Village, which later became part of Santa Clara. By the early twentieth century, Agnews boasted the largest institutional population in the South San Francisco Bay area, and was served by its own train station which stood at the west end of Palm Drive across Lafayette Street; the station building remained until vandalism and fire precipitated its demolition in the 1990s.

Individuals with developmental disabilities were first admitted to a special rehabilitation program in 1965. Programs for the mentally ill were discontinued in 1972. From then to 2011, when the property was sold, the center was used for the care and treatment of persons with developmental disabilities.

Early years
Prior to 1906, the Agnews State Hospital, constructed in 1885, was modeled after the Kirkbride Plan and designed by architect Theodore Lenzen. This building was destroyed in the 1906 San Francisco earthquake, and Agnews became infamous as the site of the Santa Clara Valley's greatest loss of life resulting from the quake.  The Daily Palo Alto reported: "The position of the people in Agnews is critical; a number of insane persons having escaped from the demolished asylum, are running at random about the country." 117 patients and staff were killed and buried in mass graves on the site. The main building and some others were irreparably damaged.

Following this disaster, Agnews was rebuilt in the Mediterranean Revival architecture styles of Mission Revival—Spanish Colonial Revival, in a layout resembling a college campus of two-story buildings. It re-opened circa 1911 as Agnews State Mental Hospital. The facility was a small self-contained town, including a multitude of construction trade "shops", a farm which raised pigs and vegetable crops, a steam generating power plant for heating the buildings by steam, and even a fire department.

West campus closure

The original west campus was closed in 1998 as part of a plan to reduce and eventually close the center. When the west campus closed, the use of the land was the subject of local controversy.  In April 1997, it was announced the state would sell an  parcel of the campus to Sun Microsystems for its corporate headquarters and R&D campus.  Some objected to the arranged sale of this prime public land to a profitable corporation at the peak of a local economic and real-estate boom, while others valued the presence of a prominent high-tech employer.  Also at issue was the preservation of and public access to historic Agnews Developmental Center buildings.  Sun agreed to restore four of the historic buildings (the auditorium, the clock tower, the superintendent's villa, and the administration building) and to keep some of the facilities available for public use.  An outdoor exhibit open to the public displays information and photographs regarding the center and its history.

In addition to the Sun deal, the Rivermark planned community was allocated  for a variety of residential, retail, public school, and open space uses.

The Agnews site was added to the National Register of Historic Places (under the name "Agnews Insane Asylum") on August 13, 1997.

Sun was acquired by Oracle Corporation in 2010; the campus continues to be used as an Oracle R&D facility and conference center.

East campus closure
In March 2009, the last patient moved out of the east campus and the residential facility was closed. The east campus provided outpatient clinic services through April 2011.

In July 2011, the Regional Project of the Bay Area and the Community State Staff Administration moved to Campbell and continued providing support to patients in the local area.

With the final sale of the land pending, the east campus was vacated and the land was turned over to the Department of General Services.

In July 2014, the City of San Jose and the Santa Clara Unified School District purchased the property from the State of California for $80 million with the intent to build a K-8, High School, and city park.

In popular media
The 1984 film Birdy by director Alan Parker used the center for the facility where the title character played by Matthew Modine is incarcerated.

The 1989 horror film The Dead Pit by director Brett Leonard was shot at the eastern campus.

The punk rock band Green Day recorded the music video for its 1994 song "Basket Case" at Agnews.

References

External links

 California Department of Developmental Services
 Article covering land re-use controversy 
 Agnews Insane Asylum, U.S. National Park Service
 New Campus, New Home, a video on the construction of the Sun Microsystems campus and preservation of the Agnews buildings
 
 
 
 

Psychiatric hospitals in California
History of Santa Clara County, California
National Register of Historic Places in Santa Clara County, California
Historic districts on the National Register of Historic Places in California
Buildings and structures in Santa Clara, California
Sun Microsystems
Hospitals established in 1885
Hospital buildings completed in 1911
Kirkbride Plan hospitals
Mission Revival architecture in California
Spanish Revival architecture in California
Hospital buildings on the National Register of Historic Places in California
Hospitals in the San Francisco Bay Area
Hospitals in Santa Clara County, California
Buildings and structures burned in the 1906 San Francisco earthquake
1885 establishments in California